Novokhusainovo (Yañı Xösäyen) is a rural locality (a village) in Kiryabinsky Selsoviet, Uchalinsky District, Bashkortostan, Russia. The population was 2 as of 2010. There is 1 street.

Geography 
Novokhusainovo is located 50 km northwest of Uchaly (the district's administrative centre) by road. Kiryabinskoye is the nearest rural locality.

References 

Rural localities in Uchalinsky District